Ray Binger (November 16, 1888 – September 29, 1970) was an American cinematographer. He started working in Hollywood in 1924, mastering the art of process photography. By 1934 he had gravitated towards special effects work. He was one of the many technicians involved in bringing authenticity to The Hurricane in 1937, and was instrumental in the plane crash sequence in Alfred Hitchcock’s Foreign Correspondent in 1940. Not all his assignments were quite that showy, however. He received an Oscar nomination in the category Best Special Effects for generating fake crowds to fill up the baseball stands in 1942's The Pride of the Yankees. He was nominated twice more in the same category for The Long Voyage Home (1940) and The North Star (1943).

References

External links

1888 births
1970 deaths
American cinematographers
Special effects people
People from Utica, Winnebago County, Wisconsin